Vahan was a Byzantine military leader of Armenian origin. He was probably killed shortly after the Battle of Yarmuk in 636.

Vahan, an Armenian who had been the garrison commander of Emesa and served as magister militum per Orientem during the Byzantine–Sasanian War of 602–628, was the overall field commander at the Yarmuk. While Vahan and part of his forces avoided destruction in the battle itself, they were pursued and killed by the Arab mobile guard during their subsequent retreat to Damascus, although other accounts state that a disgraced Vahan may have retired to a monastery in Sinai.

Arab sources emphasise the "noble and righteous conduct" of Vahan compared to other Roman commanders. Claims that Vahan or his soldiers had rebelled against Emperor Heraclius prior to Yarmouk are likely to be smears intended to pin the blame for the defeat on the Armenian.

References 

636 deaths
Byzantine people of Armenian descent
7th-century Byzantine military personnel
Year of birth unknown
Arab–Byzantine wars
7th-century Armenian people
Byzantine people of the Arab–Byzantine wars
Byzantines killed in battle
Generals of Heraclius